Georgy Tarabaih (Arabic:جرجي طربيه), also known as Jurji Antuniyus Tarabaih, was born in 1946 and died in 2020. He earned his PhD and state doctorate in Arabic language and literature from Saint Joseph University in Beirut in 1980. During his lifetime, he wrote over 40 books and was honoured with the Golden Cedar leaf from the world's Lebanese Cultural Union, among other shields and honours.

Early life and education 
Georgy Tarabaih was born in the Tannourine district of Batroun in 1946. He obtained an MA in Arabic Language and Literature from the Lebanese University in 1971, and in 1980, he obtained a PhD in Arabic Language and Literature from Saint Joseph University in Beirut. In 1984, he was bestowed with an honorary doctorate in World Literature. From 1980 until his death in 2020, Georgy Tarabaih was a member of the Lebanese University's Doctoral Committee and a Professor of Civilization, Literature, and Criticism. In 1968, he also established the Independent Student Movement. The writer also contributed to the establishment of Tannourine Public High School and served as its director in 1971. He took over as editor-in-chief of the Lebanese educational magazine in 1979.  Professor Tarabaih was a founding member of the Association of Retired Professors at the Lebanese University. He  was honoured for writing the lyrics to the Lebanese University anthem. During his lifetime, he received numerous honours and shields for his work, which included more than 40 books and ten poetry collections. In 2007, he was the leader of the delegation to the "Forum for Development, Culture, and Dialogue". After the writer passed away on January 28, 2020, an award in his honour was established in Lebanon, which is known as the "Professor Georgy Tarabaih Award for Culture and Creativity”.

Literary output

Books

Poems 
 The Lebanese University anthem (original title: nsyd algama' allbnanya)
 Poems from the visible world (original title: qṣaayd mn alʿalm almar'ey)
 Night Visitor (original title: zayrt allyl allylky)

Awards 
During his life, the professor received many honours, including:

 The Lebanese Order of Merit
 The Golden Cedar leaf from the world's Lebanese Cultural Union
 Honoured by the municipality of Tannourine.
 Honoured by the Supreme Council of Culture in Kuwait.
 Golden Star of Great Britain

References 

 
20th-century Lebanese poets
Arab writers
21st-century Lebanese poets
Saint Joseph University alumni
1946 births
2020 deaths